Arnstein Raunehaug (born 17 December 1960) is a Norwegian former cyclist. He competed in the team time trial event at the 1984 Summer Olympics.

References

External links
 

1960 births
Living people
Norwegian male cyclists
Olympic cyclists of Norway
Cyclists at the 1984 Summer Olympics
Sportspeople from Bergen